The Evangelical Lutheran Church in Guyana is a Lutheran denomination in Guyana. It is a member of the Lutheran World Federation, which it joined in 1950.

External links 
Official website
Lutheran World Federation listing

Lutheran denominations
Lutheranism in South America
Lutheran World Federation members